Tallahassee Creek is a stream in the U.S. state of Georgia. It is a tributary to Kiokee Creek.

The name "Tallahassee" is a name derived from the Muskogean language meaning "old town". Variant names are "Asteechee Creek", "Oskeetochee Creek", "Osketochee Creek", "Osketochy Creek", "Osteetchee Creek", and "Osteetoche Creek".

References

Rivers of Georgia (U.S. state)
Rivers of Dougherty County, Georgia
Rivers of Terrell County, Georgia